Sodium aluminosilicate refers to compounds which contain sodium, aluminium, silicon and oxygen, and which  may also contain water. These include synthetic amorphous sodium aluminosilicate, a few naturally occurring minerals and synthetic zeolites. Synthetic amorphous sodium aluminosilicate is widely used as a food additive, E 554.

Amorphous sodium aluminosilicate 
This substance is produced with a wide range of compositions and has many different applications. It is encountered as an additive E 554 in food where it acts as an anticaking (free flow) agent. As it is manufactured with a range of compositions it is not strictly a chemical compound with a fixed stoichiometry. One supplier quotes a typical analysis for one of their products as 14SiO2·Al2O3·Na2O·3H2O,(Na2Al2Si14O32·3H2O).

The US FDA has as of April 1, 2012 approved sodium aluminosilicate (sodium silicoaluminate) for direct contact with consumable items under 21 CFR 182.2727. Sodium aluminosilicate is used as molecular sieve in medicinal containers to keep contents dry.

Sodium aluminosilicate may also be listed as:
 aluminium sodium salt
 sodium silicoaluminate
 aluminosilicic acid, sodium salt
 sodium aluminium silicate
 aluminum sodium silicate
 sodium silico aluminate
 sasil

Minerals sometimes called sodium aluminosilicate 
Naturally occurring minerals that are sometimes given the chemical name, sodium aluminosilicate include albite (NaAlSi3O8, an end-member of the plagioclase series) and jadeite (NaAlSi2O6).

Synthetic zeolites sometimes called sodium aluminosilicate
Synthetic zeolites have complex structures and examples (with structural formulae) are:

Na12Al12Si12O48·27H2O, zeolite A (Linde type A sodium form, NaA), used in laundry detergents
Na16Al16Si32O96·16H2O, Analcime, IUPAC code ANA
Na12Al12Si12O48·q H2O, Losod
Na384Al384Si384O1536·518H2O, Linde type N

References

Inorganic compounds
Sodium compounds
Aluminosilicates
Zeolites
Food additives
E-number additives